This is a list of lieutenant generals in the United States Air Force since 2020. The rank of lieutenant general (or three-star general) is the second-highest rank normally achievable in the U.S. Air Force, and the first to have a specified number of appointments set by statute. It ranks above major general (two-star general) and below general (four-star general).

There have been 42 lieutenant generals in the U.S. Air Force since 1 January 2020. All 42 achieved that rank while on active duty in the U.S. Air Force. Lieutenant generals entered the Air Force via several paths: 19 were commissioned via the U.S. Air Force Academy (USAFA), 13 via Air Force Reserve Officer Training Corps (AFROTC) at a civilian university, seven via Air Force Officer Training School (OTS), one via AFROTC at a senior military college, one via direct commission (direct), and one via direct medical officer commission at the Uniformed Services University of the Health Sciences (USU).

List of generals
Entries in the following list of lieutenant generals are indexed by the numerical order in which each officer was promoted to that rank while on active duty, or by an asterisk (*) if the officer did not serve in that rank while on active duty in the U.S. Air Force or was promoted to four-star rank while on active duty in the U.S. Air Force. Each entry lists the general's name, date of rank, active-duty positions held while serving at three-star rank, number of years of active-duty service at three-star rank (Yrs), year commissioned and source of commission, number of years in commission when promoted to three-star rank (YC), and other biographical notes (years of birth and death are shown in parentheses in the Notes column). Officers transferred to the U.S. Space Force in the grade of lieutenant general are included while having previously held that rank in the Air Force previously are included, while Air Force officers first promoted to lieutenant general in the U.S. Space Force are excluded.

Timeline

2020–present

History

The United States Air Force originated as the Air Corps of the Regular Army. During World War II the Regular Army was augmented with a larger temporary force of reservists, volunteers, and conscripts to form the Army of the United States. Air personnel in the combined force belonged to the Army Air Forces. After the war, all Air Corps and Army Air Forces personnel split off from the Army to form the independent Air Force.

1939–1947 (U.S. Army Air Forces)

The first United States airman to become a lieutenant general was Delos C. Emmons, commanding general of General Headquarters Air Force, who was appointed to that grade under a 1940 law authorizing the President to appoint Regular Army officers to temporary higher grades in the Army of the United States. The first airman to become a lieutenant general in the Regular Army was Frank M. Andrews, who was automatically elevated to that grade upon assuming command of the Panama Canal Department in 1941. The Regular Army grade of lieutenant general had been abolished at the end of World War I, but was revived in 1939 when Congress authorized the officers commanding certain important Army formations to be temporarily appointed to the grade while detailed to those positions; these commands included the four field armies and the Panama Canal and Hawaiian Departments.

Numerous airmen were promoted to lieutenant general during World War II. Lieutenant generals typically commanded one of the numbered field armies or air forces; served as deputy theater commanders; or headed major headquarters staffs, administrative commands, or support organizations. Most World War II lieutenant generals were appointed to that grade in the Army of the United States, even if detailed to a position that already carried the Regular Army grade; unlike the ex officio Regular Army grade, which was lost if an officer was reassigned, the Army of the United States grade was personal to each individual, making it easier to transfer officers without inadvertently demoting them.

Although most air lieutenant generals belonged to the Regular Army Air Corps, anyone could be appointed lieutenant general in the Army of the United States, including reservists and civilians; James H. Doolittle was promoted to lieutenant general as an Air Corps Reserve officer and William S. Knudsen was commissioned lieutenant general directly from civilian life.

1947–1960 (U.S. Air Force)

The National Security Act of 1947 transferred all personnel in the Army Air Forces, Air Corps, and General Headquarters Air Force to the newly created United States Air Force. Lieutenant generals in the new service typically headed divisions of the Air Staff in Washington, D.C.; the unified command in Alaska; the theater air forces in Europe or the Far East; or the Air Force's top-level strategic, tactical, air defense, materiel, or transportation commands. Many early three-star commands were subsequently upgraded to four stars, and their vice commanders were elevated to three stars along with the commanders of the larger numbered air forces.

All three- and four-star ranks were made ex officio by the Officer Personnel Act of 1947, meaning that a lieutenant general had to be reconfirmed in that grade every time he changed jobs. During the Korean War the Far East Air Forces (FEAF) vice commander for operations, Major General Otto P. Weyland, was slated for a three-star job in the United States but Air Force Chief of Staff Hoyt S. Vandenberg wanted Weyland to be promoted to lieutenant general while still in the war zone, so Vandenberg created the new three-star position of deputy commanding general of FEAF just for Weyland. Once promoted, Weyland immediately returned stateside but remained technically assigned to FEAF in order to keep his new grade while waiting for the Senate to confirm him in his permanent three-star assignment as commanding general of Tactical Air Command.

It was rare but not unheard of for a lieutenant general to be demoted by accepting a transfer to a lower ranking job. Air Force Inspector General Truman H. Landon and Fifth Air Force commanding generals Frank F. Everest and Glenn O. Barcus all reverted to major general for their next assignments but regained their third stars in subsequent postings. Conversely, Major General Muir S. Fairchild skipped three-star rank entirely when he was appointed to the four-star office of vice chief of staff of the Air Force.

Modern use

There are presently 29 three-star billets in the United States Air Force. Lieutenant generals in the Air Force typically serve in high-level command and staff positions, including as commanders of major commands (MAJCOMs), commanders of numbered air forces (NAF) that are concurrently designated as service component commands under a four-star unified combatant commander and deputy commanders of four-star major commands. Under the Air Staff, this includes the director of staff and deputy chiefs of staff (limited to 8 by statute) under the authority of the chief and vice chief of staff of the Air Force, as well as the inspector general who answers directly to the service secretary. High-level specialty positions such as the surgeon general, judge advocate general, and chief of Air Force Reserve may also hold three-star rank, though not by statute. The superintendent of the United States Air Force Academy and director of the Air National Guard have been three-star positions since 1983 and 2002 respectively.

About 20 to 30 joint service three-star billets exist at any given time that can be occupied by an Air Force lieutenant general, among the most prestigious being the director of the Joint Staff (DJS), principal staff advisor to the Chairman of the Joint Chiefs of Staff and historically considered a stepping stone to four-star rank. All deputy commanders of the unified combatant commands are of three-star rank, as are directors of Defense Agencies not headed by a civilian such as the director of the Defense Intelligence Agency (DIRDIA). Internationally based three-star positions include the deputy chair of the NATO Military Committee (DCMC), United States military representative to the NATO Military Committee (USMILREP), and the security coordinator for the Palestinian National Authority in Israel. All nominees for three-star rank must be confirmed via majority by the Senate before the appointee can take office and thus assume the rank.

Statutory limits, elevations and reductions

The U.S. Code states that no more than 30 officers in the U.S. Air Force may be promoted beyond the rank of major general and below the rank of general on the active duty list, with the exception of those on joint duty assignments. However, the President may designate up to 15 additional three-star appointments, with the condition that for every service branch allotted such additional three-star appointments, an equivalent number must be reduced from other service branches. Other exceptions exist for non-active duty or reserve appointments, as well as other circumstances. As such, three-star positions can be elevated to four-star status or reduced to two-star status where deemed necessary, either to highlight their increasing importance to the defense apparatus (or lack thereof) or to achieve parity with equivalent commands in other services or regions.
 Lieutenant General Jeffrey A. Kruse was appointed the first advisor for military to the director of national intelligence on August 17, 2021 amid organizational changes to the ODNI. The role was created to serve as a "focal point" for the ODNI to communicate with the Department of Defense, including the under secretary of defense for intelligence and security, combat support agency directors and the combatant commands.

Senate confirmations

Military nominations are considered by the Senate Armed Services Committee. While it is rare for three-star or four-star nominations to face even token opposition in the Senate, nominations that do face opposition due to controversy surrounding the nominee in question are typically withdrawn. Nominations that are not withdrawn are allowed to expire without action at the end of the legislative session.
 For example, the nomination of Major General Ryan F. Gonsalves for promotion to lieutenant general and assignment as commanding general of U.S. Army Europe was withdrawn in November 2017 after an investigation was launched into the general's inappropriate comment to a female Congressional staffer. As a result, Gonsalves was administratively reprimanded and retired in May 2018.

Additionally, events that take place after Senate confirmation may still delay or even prevent the nominee from assuming office.
 For example, Major General John G. Rossi, who had been confirmed for promotion to lieutenant general and assignment as the commanding general of the U.S. Army Space and Missile Defense Command in April 2016 committed suicide two days before his scheduled promotion and assumption of command. As a result, the then incumbent commander of USASMDC, Lieutenant General David L. Mann, remained in command beyond statutory term limits until another nominee, Major General James H. Dickinson was confirmed by the Senate.

The 2020 National Defense Authorization Act explicitly prohibits adding new general officer billets to the Space Force beyond the sole four-star billet of the chief of space operations. This necessitated that five Air Force three-star appointments be transferred to the Space Force, leaving them with 30 as opposed to 35 available three-star positions.
 For example, the position of commander of the Space and Missile Systems Center (SMC) was transferred to the Space Force as the center transitioned into the Space Systems Command (SSC), the second Space Force field command to be established. The last Air Force general to command SMC, Lieutenant General John F. Thompson retired in August 2021 to make way for Lieutenant General Michael A. Guetlein, who assumed command of Space Systems Command on 13 August 2021.

See also
 Lieutenant general (United States)
 General officers in the United States
 List of active duty United States four-star officers
 List of active duty United States three-star officers
 List of United States Air Force four-star generals
 List of lieutenant generals in the United States Air Force before 1960
 List of United States Air Force lieutenant generals from 2000 to 2009
 List of United States Air Force lieutenant generals from 2010 to 2019
 List of United States Space Force lieutenant generals
 List of United States military leaders by rank

References

Notes

External links
 
 
 

United States Air Force
United States Air Force generals
 
Generals
United States Air Force generals